Citypark, stylized as CITYPARK, is a 22,500-seat soccer-specific stadium in St. Louis, Missouri. It is the home of St. Louis City SC, the city's Major League Soccer (MLS) franchise. The stadium is next to Union Station in the city's Downtown West neighborhood, and was completed in November 2022, ahead of the 2023 MLS season. Also, It's home of St. Louis City SC 2 ahead of the 2023 MLS Next Pro season.

History

Original proposal
In February 2016, MLS began the search for a downtown site to house a soccer-specific stadium. One of the locations surveyed had previously been intended for a stadium for the St. Louis Rams before the gridiron football team moved back to Los Angeles.

On February 17, an exploratory group of local businessmen calling itself "MLS2STL" formed with the goal of bringing an MLS franchise to St. Louis. Among its members were St. Louis Cardinals President Bill DeWitt III, UniGroup President Jim Powers, St. Louis Blues CEO Chris Zimmerman, Saint Louis FC owner Jim Kavanaugh and Dave Peacock, former President of Anheuser-Busch who had recently co-chaired the unsuccessful NFL stadium task force.

The land was the site of off-ramps from Interstate 64 that were the remnants of a 3.3-mile-long North-South Distributor Highway that was never built. The proposal included a request for $80 million in public money, not counting potential additional land purchases. At the same time, the full prospective ownership group was also unveiled, led by Paul Edgerley, the former managing director of Bain Capital in Boston, and including Peacock, Powers, and Kavanaugh from the original exploratory group.

Opposition and failed public funding vote
On December 19, Missouri governor-elect Eric Greitens came out against any public funding for the project, calling it "nothing more than welfare for millionaires." Edgerley said that without public funding, it would be "hard to get" an expansion franchise in St. Louis. A competing prospective ownership group, Foundry St. Louis, offered to pay the $80 million public portion if they were allowed to join SC STL's bid for MLS expansion. SC STL later asked for $40 million in state funds, but Greitens reiterated his opposition to any public contribution from the state, either tax credits or direct subsidy.

The project was endangered in January 2017 when Alderwoman Christine Ingrassia withdrew the proposal to put the $80 million public contribution to a vote. Ingrassia said that SC STL was "asking for way more than I feel like we could support here in the city."

By the end of January, the St. Louis Board of Aldermen revised the stadium bill, this time with a public contribution reduced to $60 million. It was passed on February 3, after the 10-week statutory cutoff before the public vote, requiring a judge's approval to be placed on the ballot. That approval came on February 9, when St. Louis Circuit Court Judge Michael Mullen issued a ruling allowing the city election board to add two funding measures to the city ballot.

With the city contribution on its way to the voters, SC STL formally applied for an MLS franchise on January 31, 2017.

The stadium proposal was brought to a public vote on the April 4, 2017, general municipal ballot, where it was defeated 53 to 47 percent. This defeat was seen as being potentially fatal to SC STL's efforts to bring MLS to St. Louis. However, there were reports indicating that St. Louis' bid for an MLS franchise was still active.

Revived proposal and construction
On October 9, 2018, the group "MLS 4 The Lou" announced a new proposal to build a soccer-specific stadium on the same land next to Union Station. The new ownership group was led by the Taylor family, founders of St. Louis based Enterprise Holdings, and Jim Kavanaugh, CEO of St. Louis based World Wide Technology and USL Championship side Saint Louis FC owner. The Taylor family members forming the group would make the team majority-owned by women, the first in the league and one of few ownership groups majority-controlled by women in all of professional sports. Given Kavanaugh's stake in both the MLS bid and Saint Louis FC, many people assumed that the new MLS team would inherit the Saint Louis FC identity, similar to other recent MLS expansions. However, the team ownership group clarified that this would not be the case.

Unlike previous proposals, the ownership group did not ask for any public funding for the stadium. The stadium would be privately funded and owned by the team, with upkeep funded by a tax on tickets and items sold at the stadium. The group is in negotiations for a break on the city's five-percent "amusement" or ticket tax charged for sporting events, an arrangement similar to deals given to the city's other professional sports franchises.

The proposal had widespread support from public officials, including Missouri Governor Mike Parson, St. Louis Mayor Lyda Krewson, and former St. Louis County Executive Steve Stenger. The bid met all of criteria put forth by MLS, including a solid financial backing, local government support, a strong soccer fan base, and a downtown Soccer-specific stadium with access to public transit.

On April 18, 2019, the MLS Board of Governors approved a proposal to expand to 30 teams. This was followed shortly by the release of new stadium renderings. On August 20, 2019, MLS announced it had approved St. Louis as the league's 28th franchise with the team expected to join in the 2023 season. Construction on the stadium site began in February 2020 with the closure of the exit 39 and 38B ramps off I-64 that crossed the site.

On February 15, 2022, a fifteen-year partnership with Centene Corporation was announced, renaming the stadium to Centene Stadium.

The stadium was due to open in September 2022 with two scheduled matches featuring St. Louis City SC 2, St. Louis City's developmental squad, but a power failure caused by an unrelated construction project forced the matches to be moved and for the stadium opening to be delayed.

On October 25, 2022, St. Louis City SC announced that the name was to be changed to Citypark. Centene, which had been looking to cut costs, backed out as the naming rights sponsor eight months after agreeing to the deal. The club announced that Centene would remain as a sponsor and that it would be searching for a new naming sponsor.

The stadium opened on November 16 with a friendly match between St. Louis City 2 and Bayer 04 Leverkusen of the German Bundesliga. Leverkusen won 3–0.

The first ever home MLS game for St. Louis City SC was played March 4th, 2023, hosting opposing team Charlotte FC. The first MLS goal scored at Citypark came in the same game, in the 25th minute from Charlotte FC forward Enzo Copetti. The game would end as a 3-1 victory to St. Louis City SC.

Design
The stadium appears to be designed with maximizing crowd noise in mind. Every seat will be within  of the pitch, the closest of any stadium in Major League Soccer.

International matches

See also

 Soccer-specific stadium
 List of Major League Soccer stadiums

References

External links
 

 
Sports venues in St. Louis
Major League Soccer stadiums
Soccer venues in Missouri
Sports venues in Missouri
2022 establishments in Missouri
Sports venues completed in 2022